The Redgrave family is a British acting dynasty, spanning five generations. Members of the family worked in theatre beginning in the nineteenth century, and later in film and television. Some family members have also written plays and books. Vanessa Redgrave is the most prominent, having won Oscar, Tony, Golden Globe and Emmy Awards.

Family tree
The family tree below shows the notable members of the family.

Michael Redgrave (and ancestors)

Vanessa Redgrave

Corin Redgrave

Lynn Redgrave

Marriages
Roy Redgrave and Daisy Scudamore (later changed to Margaret Scudamore); 1907 - 25 May 1922 (his death) - son Michael
Michael Redgrave and Rachel Kempson; 20 July 1935 - 21 March 1985 (his death) - son Corin, two daughters, Vanessa and Lynn
Vanessa Redgrave and (1) Tony Richardson; 1962—1967 (divorced) - two daughters, Natasha and Joely; (2) Franco Nero 2006 to present - son Carlo
Corin Redgrave and (1) Deirdre Hamilton-Hill; 1962—1975 (divorced) - daughter Jemma, son Luke; (2) Kika Markham 1985 - 6 April 2010 (his death) - two sons, Arden and Harvey
Lynn Redgrave and John Clark; 2 April 1967 – 22 December 2000 (divorced) - son Benjamin, two daughters, Kelly and Annabel
Natasha Richardson and Robert Fox; 1990 – 1992 (divorced); (2) Liam Neeson; 3 July 1994 - 18 March 2009 (her death) - two sons, Micheál and Daniel
Joely Richardson and Tim Bevan; January 1992 – July 2001 (divorced) - daughter Daisy
Jemma Redgrave and Tim Owen; 1992 — 2020 (divorced) - two sons, Gabriel and Alfie

See also
List of show business families

External links
 The House of Redgrave: The Secret Lives of a Theatrical Dynasty (Tim Adler, Aurum Press Ltd, 2011) 

 
Artist families
+
English families
Acting families